Mr Whoppit was the teddy bear mascot of Donald Campbell, the land and water speed record holder. Writing in his 2011 book, Donald Campbell: The Man Behind The Mask, journalist David Tremayne described Whoppit as Campbell's "magic talisman".

As was his father Sir Malcolm Campbell, Donald Campbell was highly superstitious. Both consulted spiritualist mediums and fortune tellers, Donald also placed his faith in a lucky mascot, Mr Whoppit. He refused to drive unless Whoppit was with him. One of his wife Tonia's tasks was to hand Whoppit to him on entering the cockpit. Whoppit was noted in 2003 by reporter Frank Bennett as being part of the "threesome" arriving for the 1964 record run  the others being Campbell himself, and his wife. Bennett remarked that the mascot was in the cockpit each time, along with other memorabilia.

Whoppit was with Campbell during his serious crash during a land-speed record attempt at the Bonneville Salt Flats in 1960, driving the Proteus Bluebird.

Campbell died as a result of a crash while driving his jet hydroplane Bluebird K7 in a record attempt on Coniston in 1967. His body was not recovered, although Mr Whoppit floated free and was found almost immediately by Leo Villa. Campbell's body was finally located and recovered in 2001.

Campbell also named one of his dogs 'Whoppit'. Another teddy bear mascot was found as a 'wife' for Whoppit, named 'Mrs Whacko', who did not ride with Whoppit but stayed with Tonia and the pit crew.

Mr Whoppit's origins
'Woppit' first appeared as a cartoon strip 'The story of Woppit' about a toy teddy bear, from the first issue of the comic Robin in 1953. In 1956, Merrythought manufactured a 9-inch tall Woppit bear wearing a red felt jacket and one of these was given to Donald by his close friend and manager Peter Barker.On joining the Bluebird team, Woppit acquired a miniature of their "Bluebird" patch sewn to his jacket, later followed by a one-piece flight suit. His name also changed slightly to 'Mr Whoppit'. In 1959, both Campbell and Mr Whoppit were photographed together in Robin.

In the late 1990s, Merrythought re-issued a limited production of 5,000 replicas of Mr Whoppit, with the original red jacket now sporting the Bluebird motif.

With Gina Campbell
In later years, Donald's daughter Gina Campbell also adopted Whoppit as a mascot for her own water record-breaking attempts. These led to Whoppit's third high-speed crash. In 1995 she offered him for auction, together with other Campbell memorabilia.  He was to sell for about £60,000 but failed to reach the reserve and so remained in her possession.  The decision to auction off Mr Whoppit was a cause of acrimony between Gina Campbell and Donald's widow Tonia Bern-Campbell, which re-surfaced again during the recovery of Bluebird in 2001.

References

Land speed record people
Teddy bears
Sports mascots